Perepadenko is a surname. Notable people with the surname include:

Hennadiy Perepadenko (born 1964), Ukrainian footballer, brother of Serhiy
Serhiy Perepadenko (born 1972), Ukrainian footballer

Ukrainian-language surnames